Norman Brookes and Anthony Wilding defeated Karl Behr and Beals Wright 6–4, 6–4, 6–2 in the all comers' final to win the gentlemen's doubles tennis title at the 1907 Wimbledon Championships. The reigning champions Frank Riseley and Sydney Smith did not defend their title.

Draw

All comers' finals

Top half

Bottom half

References

External links

Men's Doubles
Wimbledon Championship by year – Men's doubles